Glow-in-the-dark may refer to:

Science 
 Bioluminescence, the production and emission of light by a living organism
 Chemiluminescence, the emission of light (luminescence) with limited emission of heat
 Phosphorescence, a specific type of photoluminescence related to fluorescence (as seen in "glow in the dark" toys and materials)
 Radioluminescence, production of luminescence in a material by the bombardment of ionizing radiation

Music 
 "Glow in the Dark" (song), a 2014 single by The Wanted
 Glow in the Dark Tour, a 2008 concert tour by Kanye West
 Glow in the Dark (book), a 2009 biographical photo essay about the Kanye West tour
 Glow in the Dark (album), a 2009 live album by Roger Clyne and the Peacemakers
 Glow in the Dark (Buckethead album)
 "Glow in the Dark" (Iggy Pop song)
 "Glow in the Dark" (Skepta song)